The Finsch Mine is an underground diamond mine in the Northern Cape (South Africa). Located near Lime Acres, 160 km northwest of Kimberley, it was one of seven operations managed by De Beers Consolidated Mines (DBCM), formed in July 2004. Currently, it is owned by Petra Diamonds Pty Ltd.

The Finsch mine is a traditional diamantiferous kimberlite pipe, extending around 17.9 ha. Reserves are sufficient for another 23 years. Underground development started in 1978 and the shaft was commissioned in 1982.

References 

Diamond mines in South Africa
Underground mines in South Africa
Diatremes of South Africa
Landforms of the Northern Cape
Economy of the Northern Cape